Graphium idaeoides (Philippine butterfly) is a species of butterfly in the family Papilionidae. It is endemic to the Philippines. It is a perfect mimic of Idea leuconoe.

References

Sources
Page M. G.P & Treadaway,C. G.  2003 Schmetterlinge der Erde, Butterflies of the world Part XVII (17), Papilionidae IX Papilionidae of the Philippine Islands. Edited by Erich Bauer and  Thomas Frankenbach  Keltern : Goecke & Evers ; Canterbury : Hillside Books.

External links
 
 

idaeoides
Butterflies of Indochina
Endemic fauna of the Philippines
Lepidoptera of the Philippines
Vulnerable fauna of Asia
Taxonomy articles created by Polbot
Butterflies described in 1855